Atikamekw (endonym: Atikamekw Nehiromowin, literally "Atikamekw native language") is a variety of the Algonquian language Cree and the language of the Atikamekw people of southwestern Quebec, Canada. It is spoken by nearly all the Atikamekw, and therefore it is among the indigenous languages least threatened with extinction, according to some studies.

Atikamekw is a language belonging to the Cree–Montagnais–Naskapi linguistic continuum, which is part of the Central branch of the Algonquian languages of the Algic family of languages. It is sometimes classified as a dialect of Cree.

So, alternatively, it is also referred to as the "r-Dialect of Cree". Another way in which Atikamekw is distinctive among dialects of Cree is in having many loanwords from the Anishinaabe language.

Phonology

Consonants

The consonants of Atikamekw are listed below in the standard orthography and with IPA equivalents in brackets:

In Atikamekw, fortis and lenis consonants are not distinguished in writing, even though they are in speech. But if precise spelling is required, fortis consonant realised as a geminate is indicated with an underline on the letter of concern.

Vowels

The vowels of Atikamekw are listed below:

 Vowel length (shown above with a circumflex accent) is typically not indicated in the written language.

Notes

References 

 Béland, Jean-Pierre. 1978. Atikamekw Morphology & Lexicon. Ph.D. Dissertation, University of California, Berkeley.

External links

Atikamekw orthography and phonology (Languagegeek)
Native Languages page for Atikamekw
OLAC resources in and about the Atikamekw language

Atikamekw
Central Algonquian languages
Indigenous languages of the North American Subarctic
First Nations languages in Canada